The United Civic Party (UCP;) is a liberal-conservative and liberal political party in Belarus. The party opposes the government of Alexander Lukashenko and has participated in the country's elections on a few occasions, but it did not have a single member in the Belarusian parliament until one member was elected during the 2016 elections. It claims that its lack of seats is due to the unfairness of the election process.

Famous party members are former Prime Minister Michaił Čyhir, the mysteriously disappeared politicians Jury Zacharanka and Viktar Hančar, and Hienadź Karpienka, who died prematurely.

History
The party was established in 1995 as a result of a merger of two like-minded parties, the United Democratic Party (formed in 1990) and the Civil Party (formed in 1994). The party's chairman is Mikałaj Kazłoŭ; deputy chairmen are Alaksandar Dabravolski and Jarasłaŭ Ramančuk.
 
At the legislative elections, 13–17 October 2004, the party was part of the People's Coalition 5 Plus, which did not secure any seats. According to the OSCE/ODIHR Election Observation Mission, these elections fell significantly short of OSCE commitments. Universal principles and constitutionally guaranteed rights of expression, association and assembly were seriously challenged, calling into question the Belarusian authorities’ willingness to respect the concept of political competition on a basis of equal treatment. According to this mission principles of an inclusive democratic process, whereby citizens have the right to seek political office without discrimination, candidates to present their views without obstruction, and voters to learn about them and discuss them freely, were largely ignored.

In the 2008 elections, the party ran on its own, finishing in third place with 2.33 percent of the official vote and no seats gained. As with most of the opposition parties, the UCP boycotted the 2012 election, urging its supporters to abstain from voting as to not give credence to the process.

For the 2016 elections, the party formed an alliance with the BPF Party, the Belarusian Christian Democracy, the Social Democratic Party (Assembly), the 'Za svabodu' movement, the Green Party, the BLPFP, the Trade Union of Electric Industry and independent candidates. Party candidate Hanna Kanapackaja won a seat in the 97th electoral district in the Kastryčnickaja district of Minsk, making her and one other independent candidate the first opposition MPs represented in parliament since 2004. The party didn't win any seats in the 2019 Belarusian parliamentary election, and with the loss of the other pro-opposition independent, left it and the opposition without any representation within the House of Representatives once again.

Structure
UCP has an organisation for women and a youth organisation in its structure.

In 1995-2000, the youth organisation of the UCP was "Civil Forum", which left UCP during parliamentary elections of 2000, when the UCP boycotted it against the wishes of Civil Forum. Uładzimier Navasiad, chairman of Civil Forum, ran and won a seat in Parliament.

In 2000, the youth organisation was "UCP Youth", created to replace Civil Forum, but was rather an artificial structure in the party.

From later that year until 2009, YCSU Young Democrats was officially a youth wing of UCP, but in February 2009 at the congress of YCSU Young Democrats, a decision to stop cooperating with the party was taken. Some members did not support the decision to restrain cooperation with United Civic Party and left, staying as UCP Youth.

Electoral performance

Presidential elections

Legislative elections

References

External links
 

1995 establishments in Belarus
Belarusian opposition
Conservative parties in Belarus
European People's Party
International Democrat Union member parties
Liberal conservative parties
Liberal parties in Belarus
Political parties established in 1995
Political parties in Belarus
Pro-European political parties in Belarus